

Track listing 
"Ne Me Quitte Pas" (Jacques Brel, Des de Moor) – 5:32
Originally recorded by Jacques Brel on 11 September  1959, and released on his album La Valse à Mille Temps (1959).
"Sunday Morning, St Denis" (Robb Johnson) – 6:29
Originally from the Roy Bailey album Business as Usual (1994)
"I Love Paris" (Cole Porter) – 3:50
Originally from the Cole Porter musical Can-Can, set in Paris in 1893. The original production opened at the Shubert Theatre, New York, USA, 7 May  1953. The original cast recording was made on 17 May  1953, and released as an album in 1953.
"Les Marquises" (Brel, Johnson) – 6:32
Originally recorded by Jacques Brel on 1 October  1977, and released on his album Les Marquises (1977)
"Cri du Cœur" (Henri Crolla, Fran Landesman, Jacques Prévert) – 2:40
Originally recorded by Édith Piaf on 20 May  1960
"Quartier Latin" (Léo Ferré, de Moor) – 5:13
Originally from the Léo Ferré album Léo Ferré (1967)
"Marieke" (Brel, de Moor) – 4:02
Originally recorded by Jacques Brel on 12 April  1961, and released on his album 5 (1961)
"April in Paris" (Vernon Duke, Yip Harburg) – 2:48
Originally from the Vernon Duke/Yip Harburg revue Walk a Little Faster (1932). The original production opened at the St James Theatre, New York, USA, 7 December  1932.
"La Chanson des Vieux Amants" (Brel, de Moor, Gérard Jouannest) – 5:56
Originally recorded by Jacques Brel on 3 January  1967, and released on his album Jacques Brel '67 (1967)
"New Amsterdam" (Elvis Costello) – 3:32
Originally from the Elvis Costello and the Attractions album Get Happy!! (1980)
"Les Poètes" (Ferré, de Moor) – 3:19
Originally from the Léo Ferré album Paname (1961)
"The Space In Between" (Barb Jungr, James Tomalin) – 3:14
"No Regrets" (Hal Davis, Charles Dumont, Michel Vaucaire) – 2:48
Originally recorded as "Non, je ne regrette rien" by Édith Piaf on 10 November  1960

Personnel

Musicians 
Barb Jungr - vocals
Russell Churney - piano (tracks 1, 4, 7, 9-10)
Simon Wallace - piano (tracks 3, 5, 8, 13)
Kim Burton - accordion (tracks 2, 3, 5, 7-9, 11), piano (tracks 6, 11-12), kaval (track 4)
Rolf Wilson - violin (tracks 3, 5-6, 8, 11-13)
Julie Walkington - double bass
James Tomalin - samples (tracks 1, 5-7, 10, 12)
Kevin Hathway - percussion (tracks 2, 4-6, 10, 12)

Other personnel 
Calum Malcolm - engineer, mixing, mastering
Ben Turner - post-production
John Haxby - design, photography
Douglas Gibb - photography

References

External links 
Chanson: The Space In Between
Chanson: The Space In Between section of the Des de Moor website
Barb Jungr
Official website
Simon Wallace biography
Simon Wallace section of the Fran Landesman website
Kim Burton biography
Kim Burton section of the Joglaresa website
Rolf Wilson biography
Rolf Wilson section of the Musicians Gallery website
Julie Walkington biography
Julie Walkington section of the Jazz Site website
James Tomalin biography
Staff profiles section of the Lime Music website
Kevin Hathway biography
Kevin Hathway section of the Royal College of Music website
John Haxby
Official website

Barb Jungr albums
2000 albums